In ballet, a grand pas (literally, big or large step) is a suite of dances that serves as a showpiece for lead dancers, demi-soloists, and in some cases the corps de ballet. It usually consists of an entrée (introduction), a grand adage, sometimes a dance for the corps de ballet (often referred to as the ballabile), optional variations (solo dances) for the demi-soloists, variations for the lead ballerina or danseur or both, and a coda (sometimes referred to as a coda générale or grand coda), which concludes the suite.

Formats

The grand pas appears in a variety of formats and may employ varying numbers of dancers. For example, a grand pas de deux is performed by only two dancers; this typically serves as the pièce de résistance for the principal male and female characters of a full-length ballet. A grand pas for three soloists is a grand pas de trois, and for four soloists is a grand pas de quatre. An elaborate grand pas is found in the 1862 ballet The Pharaoh's Daughter and its 2000 revival, consisting of an entrée, variations for three demi-soloists, a grand adage, a waltz for the corps de ballet, variations for three lead soloists, and coda générale.

A grand pas d'action is a grand pas that contributes to the ballet's story. A well-known example of this is the first act of The Sleeping Beauty, consisting of the Rose Adagio grand adage, Dance for the Maids of Honor and Pages, Princess Aurora variation, and coda which is abruptly interrupted by the evil fairy Carabosse, who gives Princess Aurora a poisoned spindle. This grand pas d'action tells an integral part of the story, with Princess Aurora choosing between four prospective princes and receiving a rose from each.

In a grand pas classique, classical ballet technique prevails and the piece itself does not carry the action of the ballet forward. A well-known example of such a piece is the grand pas created by Marius Petipa in 1881 for his revival of the ballet Paquita, known today as Paquita Grand Pas Classique.

Ballet terminology